Sara Lou Harris Carter (July 4, 1923 – December 16, 2016) was a pioneering African-American model also known as an entertainer, educator and humanitarian.

Early life and career
She was born in Wilkesboro, North Carolina, on July 4, 1923, to a house painter and a cotton mill worker. She died on December 16, 2016.

She was the first African American model to be featured in a national poster campaign in the 1940s for Lucky Strike cigarettes. She also broke barriers by becoming the first African-American model in the New York buyers' fashion show, thus changing the face of the black woman model from servant to glamour girl.

Education
Carter graduated from Bennett College in Greensboro, North Carolina, in 1943 with a BA in education. After graduation, she taught third grade in North Carolina. She continued her studies for a master's degree at Columbia University in New York. While at Columbia, she supported herself by working as a model, actress, dancer and doing radio and television work.

Works
Famously known for her elegance and charm, Carter became the first African American châtelaine of the embassy when her husband John Carter of Guyana became ambassador to the United States, Canada, the United Kingdom and the United Nations. Her husband was knighted in 1966, which entitled her to use the title Lady Sara Carter.

She suffered from Alzheimer's disease and died on Friday, December 16, 2016, following the death of a granddaughter from cancer earlier that year.

References

1923 births
2016 deaths
African-American female models
American female models
African-American models
Columbia University alumni
Bennett College alumni
20th-century African-American people
21st-century African-American people
20th-century African-American women
21st-century African-American women
American humanitarians
Women humanitarians